Alpine, elevation , is a small community, sometimes considered a ghost town, in Chaffee County, Colorado, United States.  It was founded in the 1860s as a mining town.

When the mines played out, the Mary Murphy Mine about four miles from St. Elmo was the last to close in 1910, and both Alpine and St. Elmo  became ghost towns.  There were still a few residents who continued to live in the two towns, but the towns were nearly empty for half a century. Then in the 1950s and 1960s people rediscovered the quiet beauty of Chalk Creek gulch and built summer homes. Some of the salvageable buildings in Alpine and St. Elmo were fixed up and still stand.  

The San Isabel National Forest completely surrounds Alpine and St. Elmo and prevents more extensive development.  Elk, deer, big horn sheep, and bears share the forest with their human guests as well as the odd mountain lion and moose. St. Elmo remains a local tourist attraction as a ghost town with a part-time general store and some year-round residents.  Alpine is more residential and has no tourist interest. Alpine has about 10 families who live there year-round, and a summer population of several hundred.

Geography

References

External links
Alpine - Colorado Ghost Town

Ghost towns in Colorado
Former populated places in Chaffee County, Colorado